Leopold Innocenty Nepomucen Polzer (15 October 1697 – 5 January 1753) was a Polish lawyer.

Polzer was born and died in Cieszyn.  He was mayor of Cieszyn from 1735 until 1750, founder of Latinae Sodalitatis Teschini, and the grandfather of Leopold Szersznik.

References
 Golec J., Bojda S., Słownik biograficzny ziemi cieszyńskiej, t. 3, Cieszyn 1998, s. 203

 
 
 
 
 

People from Cieszyn
18th-century Polish–Lithuanian lawyers
1697 births
1753 deaths